In theoretical physics, an extremal black hole is a black hole with the minimum possible mass that is compatible with its charge and angular momentum.

The concept of an extremal black hole is theoretical and none have thusfar been observed in nature. However, many theories are based on their existence.

In supersymmetric theories, extremal black holes are often supersymmetric: they are invariant under several supercharges. This is a consequence of the BPS bound. Such black holes are stable and emit no Hawking radiation. Their black hole entropy can be calculated in string theory.

It has been suggested by Sean Carroll that the entropy of an extremal black hole is equal to zero. Carroll explains the lack of entropy by creating a separate dimension for the black hole to exist within.

The Hawking radiation of extremal black holes are considered non-thermal (non-Planck distributed), with no associated temperature. 

The hypothetical black hole electron is super-extremal (having more charge and angular momentum than a black hole of its mass "should").

See also
Black hole information paradox
Black hole thermodynamics
Near-extremal black hole
Quantum gravity
Trans-Planckian problem

Notes

External links
Extremal RN Black Hole
N=2 extremal black holes

+